Melvin E. Sherwin (1881–1924) was a founding member of FarmHouse fraternity at the University of Missouri, and was later the head of the soils department at what is now called North Carolina State University from 1910 until his death in 1924 at the age of 42.

He graduated from Missouri with a B.S. in agriculture in 1908, and later received an M.A. in agriculture from the University of California-Berkeley in 1909.  He spent one year as an agronomy instructor at the University of Maine before joining the staff at NC State in 1910.

References
 Material pulled from the records of FarmHouse International Fraternity, Inc.

External links

 

North Carolina State University faculty
FarmHouse founders
1881 births
1924 deaths
University of Missouri alumni